is a 1978 animated Christmas musical television special based on Charles Dickens' 1843 novella A Christmas Carol. It was created by Arthur Rankin Jr. and Jules Bass, and features traditional animation rather than the stop motion animation most often used by the company. It was an animated remake of a long-unseen, but quite well received, live-action musical special (also called The Stingiest Man in Town) which had starred Basil Rathbone, Martyn Green, and Vic Damone. The live-action version had been telecast on December 23, 1956, on the NBC anthology series The Alcoa Hour, and was published on DVD in 2011, by VAI. The animated remake first aired December 23, 1978, in the United States on NBC, and was telecast in Japan the next day.

Plot
The Stingiest Man in Town is the tale of Ebenezer Scrooge, told through the perspective of the insect B.A.H. Humbug (voiced by Tom Bosley), a word play on Scrooge's catchphrase, "bah humbug". Scrooge (voiced by Walter Matthau) is portrayed as the tightwad Charles Dickens intended him to be, with his consistent resistance to assist the poor, or even have Christmas dinner with his nephew Fred (voiced by Dennis Day) and his family. In hopes of resuscitating the goodness of his friend, the ghost of Jacob Marley (voiced by Theodore Bikel), Scrooge's former business partner, visits Scrooge in his mansion, exhorting him to change his ways. Scrooge deems this to be madness and soon prepares for bed.

Nevertheless, Scrooge's attitude soon changes after a fateful night, wherein three ghosts visit him and take him through his past and present, and show him what his future will be like if he does not change. Scrooge sees a younger version of himself (voiced by Robert Morse) and realizes how greedy and miserly he has become. The Ghost of Christmas Present (voiced by Paul Frees) proceeds to take Scrooge to the home of his diligent employee Bob Cratchit, and discovers just how much poverty Cratchit and his family wallow in. Cratchit's crippled son Tiny Tim (voiced by Bobby Rolofson) touches Scrooge's heart and instigates a transformation within his personality. The Ghost of Christmas Future then brings Scrooge to a cemetery to show the result of his once greedy behaviour. The production concludes with Scrooge assisting those less fortunate than himself.

Cast
Walter Matthau - Ebenezer Scrooge
 Robert Morse - Young Scrooge
 Tom Bosley - B. A. H. Humbug, Esq.
 Theodore Bikel - Marley's Ghost
 Dennis Day - Nephew Fred
 Paul Frees - The Ghost of Christmas Past, The Ghost of Christmas Present
 Sonny Melendrez - Bob Cratchit
 Debbie Clinger - Martha Cratchit
 Robert Rolofson - Tiny Tim
 Steffani Calli - Belinda Cratchit
 Eric Hines - Peter Cratchit
 Darlene Conley - Mrs. Cratchit
 Shelby Flint - Belle
 Charles Matthau - The Boy
 Dee Stratton - Voice
 Diana Lee - Voice

Staff
 Producers/Directors - Arthur Rankin, Jr., Jules Bass
 Associate Producer - Masaki Iizuka
 Writer - Romeo Muller
 Based on the 1843 novella A Christmas Carol - Charles Dickens
 Music - Fred Spielman
 Book and Lyrics - Janice Torre
 Design - Paul Coker, Jr.
 Animation Coordinator - Toru Hara
 Animation Supervisor - Tsuguyuki Kubo
 Animation Director - Katsuhisa Yamada
 Background Design - Minoru Nishida
 Backgrounds - Kazusuke Yoshihara, Kazuko Ito
 Layouts - Kazuyuki Kobayashi, Tadakatsu Yoshida, Hidemi Kubo
 Animation - Yoshiko Sasaki, Masahiro Yoshida
 Sound Recording - John Curcio, John Richards, Dave Iveland, Robert Elder
 Sound Effects - Tom Clack
 Vocal Arrangements - Jerry Graff
 Music Supervision - Maury Laws
 Music Arranger/Conductor - Bernard Hoffer

Production
As with previous Rankin-Bass specials, animation duties for the 1978 version were provided by a Japanese studio, in this case Topcraft, many of whose animators would later form the core of Studio Ghibli. Given that The Stingiest Man in Town was actually broadcast in Japan on Christmas Eve of 1978 (under the title Machi Ichiban Kechinbō), it is listed as an anime in some sources.  The Japanese version was directed by Katsuhisa Yamada, better known for his work on Mazinger Z and Devil Hunter Yohko and the characters were designed by Paul Coker Jr.

Songs
The production features an unusual number of songs, far more than in other animated productions of the story.

 Sing a Christmas Carol
 An Old Fashioned Christmas
 Humbug
 The Stingiest Man in Town
 I Wear a Chain
 Golden Dreams
 It Might Have Been
 The Christmas Spirit
 Yes, There is a Santa Claus
 Birthday Party of the King
 One Little Boy
 You Wear a Chain
 Mankind Should be My Business

See also
 Adaptations of A Christmas Carol
 List of Christmas films

References

External links
 
 

1978 anime films
1978 in American television
1978 television films
1978 films
1978 television specials
1970s American television specials
1970s animated television specials
1978 drama films
American Christmas films
American musical fantasy films
Animated Christmas films
Animated Christmas television specials
Christmas television specials
Drama anime and manga
Historical anime and manga
Films based on A Christmas Carol
Television shows based on A Christmas Carol
Television shows directed by Jules Bass
Television shows directed by Arthur Rankin Jr.
Films directed by Katsuhisa Yamada
Ghosts in television
Topcraft
Rankin/Bass Productions television specials
Animated films based on novels
Television shows written by Romeo Muller
Musical television specials
1970s American films